This is a list of notable active virtual communities with more than 1 million registered members.

Defunct

See also
 List of virtual communities
 List of social bookmarking websites
 List of most-played video games by player count
 List of most-played mobile games by player count

Notes

References

Virtual communities